Maharajganj is a constituency of the Uttar Pradesh Legislative Assembly covering the city of Maharajganj in the Maharajganj district of Uttar Pradesh, India.

Maharajganj is one of five assembly constituencies in the Maharajganj Lok Sabha constituency. Since 2008, this assembly constituency is numbered 318 amongst 403 constituencies.

Members of Legislative Assembly

Election results

2022

2017
Bharatiya Janta Party candidate Jai Mangal Kanojiya won in 2017 Uttar Pradesh Legislative Elections defeating Bahujan Samaj Party candidate Nirmesh Mangal by a margin of 68,361 votes.

References

External links
 

Assembly constituencies of Uttar Pradesh
Maharajganj district